Shogun Finance Ltd v Hudson [2003] UKHL 62 is an English contract law case decided in the House of Lords, on the subject of mistaken identity as a basis for rescission of a contract. The case has been the subject of much criticism in failing to effectively clarify the area of mistake to identity.

Facts
A rogue went to a dealer to buy a Mitsubishi Shogun on hire purchase. The rogue told them that his name was Mr Patel and produced Mr Patel’s driving licence. The dealer communicated with Shogun Finance, which did a credit check on Mr Patel. Finding no problems, Shogun Finance authorized the hire purchase agreement and the rogue drove away.

The rogue then sold the car to Mr Norman Hudson, who had no knowledge that the vehicle belonged to Shogun Finance and was subject to an apparent hire purchase agreement. Shogun Finance brought a claim against Mr Hudson for the return of its vehicle. Mr Hudson relied on section 27 of the Hire Purchase Act 1964, which creates a statutory exception to the common law principle that "nemo dat quod non habet" (nobody can pass better title than he has), since a non-trade buyer of a car who buys in good faith from a hirer under a hire purchase agreement becomes the owner.

Judgment
In a 3-2 decision, the majority of the House of Lords held there was no contract of hire purchase between Shogun Finance and the rogue, section 27 of the Hire Purchase Act therefore did not apply and the car was not Mr Hudson's. Lord Hobhouse, Lord Phillips and Lord Walker followed the principle established in Cundy v Lindsay, a contract where identity is of key importance is void if the purchaser lies about their identity. The face-to-face exemption established by Phillips v Brooks Ltd did not apply because the seller was not the dealer but the finance company.

Lord Nicholls and Lord Millett dissented, arguing that a better policy would be to remove the face-to-face distinction and protect the good-faith purchaser in all cases:

Such an idea was proposed by the Law Reform Committee in 1966 in its twelfth report. That would mean that in all cases of mistake to identity, contracts would be voidable, rather than immediately void. Therefore, if the original seller did not repudiate the contract before the goods have been sold on, the third party would be protected.

Reception
The result of Shogun Finance Ltd v Hudson is that the area of mistake to identity retains the 'face to face' distinction: contracts of immediate vicinity differ from contracts made over distance. Such a distinction has been labelled "artificial and unfair" to third parties, who bear the entire loss if, at least in the instant case, it is argued that Shogun Finance Ltd had far better means to uncover the rogue's fraud than the independent purchaser; in any case, the original seller is usually in the better position to protect and insure against such risks.

See also
 Cundy v Lindsay
Morrisson v Robertson
Misrepresentation in English law
Mistake in English law

Notes

References
 Elliot, C (2004). "No justice for innocent purchasers of dishonestly obtained goods: Shogun Finance v Hudson", Journal of Business Law, May 2004
 Foster, A (2004). "Sale by a non-owner: striking a fair balance between the rights of the true owner and a buyer in good faith", Coventry Law Journal, 9(2)
 MacMillan, C (2004). "Mistake as to identity clarified?", Law Quarterly Review, 120(Jul)

External links
Full text of the judgment from parliament.uk

English misrepresentation case law
English mistake case law
House of Lords cases
2003 in case law
2003 in British law